The 1987 Junior League World Series took place from August 17–22 in Taylor, Michigan, United States. Rowland Heights, California defeated Wappinger, New York twice in the championship game.

Teams

Results

References

Junior League World Series
Junior League World Series
Junior